VoteRiders is an American non-partisan, non-profit 501(c)(3) organization whose mission is to ensure that all US citizens over 18 years old are able to exercise their right to vote. Through resources and media exposure, one of its main focuses is assisting citizens who want to secure their voter ID, and it often collaborates with other organizations in these efforts.

Its work on advocacy and legal aid has been described by Professor Carol Anderson, author of One Person, No Vote: How Voter Suppression Is Destroying Our Democracy, as one that "makes the difference in whether thousands of people get to vote or are disenfranchised." Professor Joshua A. Douglas of the University of Kentucky College of Law has called VoteRiders "one of the most important democracy groups you've probably never heard of." The Rockefeller Foundation reports that VoteRiders has achieved reaching over 7 million voters directly with ID information and assistance with a dedicated group of 9,000 volunteers, in the 2022 election cycle.

Overview and Mission
VoteRiders was founded in 2012 by Kathleen Unger, an election integrity specialist, and is headquartered in Santa Monica, California.

A 501(c)(3) national tax-exempt organization, VoteRiders has been featured extensively in local, national and international media in connection with voter ID issues. VoteRiders' President Kathleen Unger has been asked to speak on voter ID issues at colleges and universities such as Pepperdine University, Occidental College, Stanford University, and Columbia University. Unger has also participated as an expert/panelist at such events as the Carter Center Baker Institute webinar on Voter Registration and Voter ID.

To promote the cause of ballot access nationwide, VoteRiders has broadened its website to be a comprehensive portal for state-by-state information about voter ID requirements and has developed printable wallet cards that highlight the IDs specified in each state's voter ID law in English and Spanish, which are available on its website. They also established a toll free helpline that citizens can call or text for voter ID information and assistance.

The non-profit's voter outreach includes holding Voter ID Clinics, which provide direct aid to local communities to assist citizens in obtaining critical documents like birth certificates and proof of citizenship. The VoteRiders volunteer team participates in outreach such as research, training, tabling, phone- and text-banking as well as letter-writing. VoteRiders partners with national organizations such as the Election Protection Coalition and Rock the Vote as well as state and local organizations.

Voteriders received the Guidestar Platinum Seal of Transparency in 2021, its highest level of transparency.

Partner Organizations and Individual Supporters 
As of 2022, VoteRiders has attracted over 1,150 partner organizations including: AerioConnect, Aflac, Ben & Jerry's, Barbra Streisand Foundation, BridgeTogether Fund, Creative Artists Agency, Crooked Media, Crowell & Moring, DLA Piper, Facebook, Flora Family Foundation (run by family of William R. Hewlett and Flora Lamson Hewlett), Galaxy Theatres, Gibbs Law Group, Goodwin Procter, Google, Hamilton (Ham4Progress), the Heinz Endowments, the Houston Endowments, Hulu, Kilpatrick Townsend & Stockton, Latham & Watkins,  Mayer Brown, Morgan, Lewis & Bockius, Newman's Own Foundation, Orrick, Herrington & Sutcliffe, Paramount, Patagonia, the Philadelphia Eagles, Rockefeller Foundation, SalesForce, Unilever, Universal Music, White & Case and The Ziering Family Foundation.

Leaders, television personalities, entertainers, actors, athletes, writers, and influencers have supported and promoted VoteRiders efforts, including Elizabeth Banks, Michael Bennett, Jack Black, Chadwick Boseman, Jordana Brewster, Connie Britton, Yvette Nicole Brown, Andy Cohen, Miley Cyrus, Viola Davis, Leonardo DiCaprio, America Ferrera, Josh Gad, Amber Heard, Ed Helms, Allison Janney, Daniel Dae Kim, Nick Kroll, Padma Lakshmi, Eva Longoria, Meghan Markle (Meghan, Duchess of Sussex), Audra McDonald, Debra Messing, Alyssa Milano, Monica, Michelle Obama, Rory O'Malley, Piper Perabo, Jeff Perry, Andrew Rannells, Mark Ruffalo, Zoe Saldana, Paul Scheer, Amy Schumer, Ryan Seacrest, Sarah Silverman, Nolan Smith, J. Smith-Cameron, Barbra Streisand, Will Swenson, Marisa Tomei, Gabrielle Union, Joyce Vance, Kerry Washington, Trisha Yearwood, and the cast of Hamilton (Ham4Progress).

 The Rockefeller Foundation published an article about VoteRiders “Building a Resilient Democracy, One Identity Card at a Time”, where it quotes Reverend Dr. Monica Spencer “It is extremely important to keep working in years when the ballot boxes aren’t open,” she said. “If we don’t plant the seeds, we won’t get a crop.”
 VoteRiders partnered with Facebook to integrate state-by-state guidance on voter ID laws into Facebook's Voting Information Center. This allows users nationwide to access ID requirements as they create their voting plans.
 VoteRiders partnered with Lyft to distribute unique state voter ID information cards to Lyft Hubs across the country for drivers to carry in their vehicles.
 VoteRiders public service announcements and contact information have been shared on Facebook, Instagram and Twitter by numerous celebrities, including Michelle Obama, Leonardo DiCaprio, Ryan Seacrest, Jonathan Van Ness and Kerry Washington.
 Crooked Media's "Vote Save America" page informs voters about upcoming elections and cites VoteRiders as a resource for citizens who need information about their state's ID requirements. Crooked Media's "Save My State" initiatives have been retweeted by numerous high-profile individuals, including President Obama.
 In June 2020, Magnolia Pictures and Participant media company announced the release of a documentary: "John Lewis: Good Trouble." The film celebrates the legacy of Georgia congressman and civil rights leader John Lewis. To coincide with the documentary's release, Participant announced a Good Trouble impact campaign to provide support for disenfranchised communities and raise awareness of voting rights. VoteRiders partnered with other organizations to support the campaign and organized a virtual screening in August 2020. In a comment for a BET.com article on the film and campaign, VoteRiders COO Shannon Anderson said, "VoteRiders' mission is inspired by John Lewis' lifelong commitment to our democracy and our fundamental right to vote." 
In September 2020, VoteRiders partnered with numerous celebrities including Zoe Saldana, Amy Schumer, Elizabeth Banks, Rory O'Malley, and Amber Heard for the #IDCheck challenge to help spread the word to voters about what would be required of them to vote in the upcoming election.
Shortly before Election Day 2020, media outlet Complex published a voter ID guide for each state that highlighted social media outreach from Democracy Docket and actor/comedian Amy Schumer urging voters who need help with ID to contact VoteRiders.
In 2022, VoteRiders partnered with Snapchat to provide Snapchat users with new voter registration and awareness tools.
VoteRiders' Arizona Voter ID Coalition coordinator, partnered with the Phoenix Indian Center to assist voters in making sure they had the proper ID needed to cast a ballot.

Activities 
Voter ID laws vary nationwide. According to a study cited in Journalist's Resource, a reference desk established by the Shorenstein Center on Media, Politics and Public Policy at Harvard University, the "evidence supports the notion that strict voter identification laws prevent otherwise eligible individuals from voting, and have disproportionately negative impacts on minority citizens."

To help ensure that all eligible citizens can exercise their right to vote, VoteRiders gets involved with on-the-ground voter education initiatives and provides expertise to local, national, niche and youth-oriented media outlets to reach voters and increase awareness of potential obstacles to voting. Recent examples of these efforts include the following:
 VoteRiders' Voter ID Chatbot is available via SMS, Facebook Messenger and website chat, allowing voters across the country to get real-time guidance from VoteRiders.
 A 2019 documentary narrated by Jeffrey Wright, "Rigged: The Voter Suppression Playbook," included clips that featured VoteRiders. 
Miami Herald columnist Leonard Pitts Jr. quoted Professor Carol Anderson in a November 8, 2019 column on voter suppression: "Support civil-society organizations that are doing so much to help folks get registered to vote and get out the vote. I mean folks like Indivisible (indivisible.org), the NAACP Legal Defense Fund (naacpldf.org), the ACLU (aclu.org), VoteRiders (voteriders.org). Those are the folks doing some heavy lifting fighting for this democracy..."
 VoteRiders founder Kathleen Unger wrote a column entitled "End the voting confusion and misinformation war," which was published in The Hill on October 30, 2018.
 The New York Times referenced VoteRiders as a source of information on voter ID requirements in a November 6, 2018 article about questions voters may have about voting in the midterm elections.
 In the run-up to the 2018 election, VoteRiders was mentioned as a resource to help voters obtain ID in a Glamour magazine article about modern attempts to disenfranchise women and people of color. 
 Professor Carol Anderson, author of One Person, No Vote: How Voter Suppression Is Destroying Our Democracy, was interviewed on "The Daily Show" on October 1, 2018, and at KQED News on October 23, 2018, where she discussed modern-day voter suppression and mentioned VoteRiders as a resource for people who need voter ID. 
 A VoteRiders coordinator was quoted in an Essence article published on November 1, 2018 about the importance of ensuring that black women participate in the democratic process.
 In the 2020 election, 35 states had voter ID laws. Some states require a current government-issued photo ID, while others' requested list may include an official document such as a bank statement, paystub or utility bill showing the voter's name and address. VoteRiders founder Kathleen Unger noted that in many states "it's not enough to register to vote." She announced that VoteRiders is partnering with major law firms and other voter protection groups to provide assistance to voters who need information on the ID laws in their state and help them obtain the required ID.
 Unger raised the alarm about the possibility that signature matching problems on mail-in ballots could become the "hanging chad of 2020" since more voters are expected to vote by mail due to the pandemic. She noted that older voters, younger voters and voters with disabilities may be especially vulnerable to having their ballots disqualified due to signature matching issues.
VoteRiders assisted voters in finding information about local transportation efforts to help them get to polling locations in the November 2020 election.
 An interview with Kathleen Unger in the January 6, 2021 issue of Ms. described her as "one of the leading experts and legal minds when it comes to election protection" and quotes her that "VoteRiders was born of outrage - my outrage that people will be deprived of their right to vote"
On April 27, 2021 Unger was interviewed by ABC News' Devin Dwyer where she spoke of the urgency of voter ID efforts in the face of new voting requirements being enacted in multiple US states.
In an October 2022 article on obstacles trans people face due to voter ID laws and state rules governing trans identification, Rolling Stone cited VoteRiders as a resource that can help voters get the ID they need and respond to challenges from elections officials. VoteRiders was also cited as a voter ID resource for trans voters in an October 2022 article in The 19th and a trans voter guide published in November 2022 by Them.

VoteRiders informs and helps voters as well as partners with other national organizations in addition to state and local organizations in 36 states — Alabama, Arizona, Arkansas, California, Colorado, Connecticut, Florida, Georgia, Illinois, Indiana, Iowa, Kansas, Kentucky, Louisiana, Maryland, Massachusetts, Michigan, Minnesota, Mississippi, Missouri, Montana, Nevada, New Hampshire, New Jersey, New York, North Carolina, Ohio, Pennsylvania, South Carolina, Tennessee, Texas, Utah, Vermont, Virginia, West Virginia and Wisconsin as well as in District of Columbia.

Some of VoteRiders' on the ground efforts include:

Alabama
VoteRiders founder Kathleen Unger was quoted in an October 30, 2018 article in the Montgomery Advertiser on Alabama's photo ID law: "At this point, we see 25 million eligible voters nationally who do not have a current government issued photo ID, which is the primary type of ID that states require. We've discovered over time that many millions more eligible voters are so confused and intimidated by voter ID laws, which are complicated and onerous, that they won't vote, even though they have valid ID."

The article noted VoteRiders' work with local groups in Alabama, including Faith in Action, to educate voters and help them secure ID, quoting Unger again: "It is understandable that people would feel overwhelmed by the legalities of voter ID laws. The key reason for our existence is to make it easy. ... Our goal is for people to be fully prepared and fully confident."

In the weeks preceding the December 2017 Roy Moore–Doug Jones special election to the U.S. Senate in Alabama, VoteRiders actively assisted voters in obtaining the IDs that made them eligible to cast a ballot.

Florida
After Hurricane Maria devastated Puerto Rico in 2017, the island experienced the largest out-migration in its history, and Florida was the top destination to resettle in the aftermath of the storm. In June 2018, VoteRiders began a campaign to assist resettled citizens who wished to cast a ballot in Florida, educating potential voters on what documents are required and helping them secure identification. In September, 2021, the League of Women Voters of Florida partnered with VoteRiders to ensure that Florida voters can acquire the documents needed to comply with new requirements introduced by Florida's Senate Bill 90 which was passed in May, 2021. In March 2022, First Coast News reported on a Jacksonville woman who got a ride and advice on how to get valid ID. This not only helps her register to vote, but in her case it helped her receive life-saving medical treatment.

Georgia
Georgia's "exact match" law resulted in widespread confusion about voter ID requirements and eligibility in the 2018 election. VoteRiders developed targeted digital and radio public service announcements to provide comprehensive and timely information. The public service announcements were widely shared on Facebook, including by celebrities such as Leonardo DiCaprio, who has 18 million followers on the social media platform. On January 2, 2021 and prior to Georgia's runoff elections, America Ferrera and Eva Longoria joined VoteRiders in a textbanking event to educate and assist Latina voters regarding the state's voter ID laws. Ryan Seacrest referenced VoteRiders on Twitter, reminding Georgia voters about the election and voter ID requirements. An interview with Kathleen Unger in the January 6, 2021 issue of Ms. focuses in detail on the far-reaching role of VoteRiders in the January 2021 senate run-off elections in Georgia

Texas
In response to a 2012 Justice Department report that some 1.4 million Texans would be affected by the Texas Voter ID Law, VoteRiders hosted its first Voter ID Clinic in Houston on September 21, 2013, and in May 2014, the organization hired a coordinator to work with local groups on voter ID initiatives. VoteRiders also reached out to elected officials on the federal, state and local levels in Harris County and contacted precinct chairs for both the Republican and Democratic parties. Tables with information on the new law were set up at church services and other public gatherings.

Partner organizations hosted presentations to explain the new law to the public. Volunteers were trained for voter outreach. It was a first step toward VoteRiders' ultimate goal: a nationwide network of partner organizations and volunteers dedicated to helping eligible citizens get the documents they need to vote.

VoteRiders' partner Mi Familia Vota Texas distributed wallet-sized VoteRiders' Texas Voter ID Information Cards as part of their canvassing effort in six majority Latino precincts in Houston for the November 2016 election. While overall Houston/Harris County voter turnout decreased by 1% (compared with the 2012 presidential election), turnout in these six precincts increased cumulatively by 92% and by an average of almost 9%; and in 2018, turnout in the 13 precincts where Mi Familia Vota Texas distributed VoteRiders' Voter ID Information Cards increased by an average of 435% (compared to 2014).

VoteRiders has a direct mailing outreach campaign in Texas to provide information for obtaining state issued IDs. VoteRiders has identified seniors who no longer drive, students, and people of color as populations impacted by new voter ID requirements. In addition, they are also contacting 25,000 Texas voters whose ballots were rejected in the March 2022 primary. Texas is one of seven key states that have enacted stricter voter ID rules since the 2020 elections.

Wisconsin
VoteRiders has participated in on-the-ground voter ID requirement awareness and outreach campaigns in Wisconsin since 2015, forming coalitions with local leaders and engaging in education efforts via regional media. An interview with Milwaukee's alternative weekly newspaper, Shepherd Express, highlighted VoteRiders' role as the source of wallet-sized Voter ID Information Cards and voter ID clinic resources. A VoteRiders statewide coordinator was featured in a video produced by NowThis Politics, which has more than 10 million Facebook followers.

VoteRiders was featured in a 2018 investigative piece about how Wisconsin voter ID laws posed challenges to the young, the elderly and people of color; the article stated that the organization's services include "arranging transportation to local Division of Motor Vehicle offices, free legal assistance in obtaining proper documentation, and covering the costs of documents required for registering to vote such as birth certificates and Social Security cards."

It is estimated that approximately 600,000 (18%) of registered Wisconsin voters in 2016 were negatively impacted by the state's newly enforced voter ID law. This number includes more than 300,000 registered voters who did not have an acceptable voter photo ID and an additional 300,000 voters who were confused and intimidated by the state's voter ID law even though they did have the correct ID. This reality motivated VoteRiders to lead the nation's first ever "Voter ID Month," which took place in Wisconsin in March 2016.

VoteRiders' efforts in Wisconsin were spearheaded by national and state coordinators, including Anita Johnson, Wisconsin Statewide Coordinator, who worked with the organization's partners, such as the Dane County Voter ID Coalition. Reporting directly to VoteRiders founder Kathleen Unger, these coordinators' efforts included training volunteers, including throughout Dane County, interacting with thousands of voters to make sure they had valid ID and, if not, helping them obtain documents to get voter ID, and arranging transportation to the DMV, oftentimes with a member of VoteRiders' team to assist.

Activities were focused especially on low-income and transient voters (including young professionals) by way of events and presentations with voters at churches, colleges, high schools, libraries, homeless shelters, food pantries, job centers, education centers, apartment buildings and corporations, etc., in downtown Madison and throughout the county. Examples include phone banks, the University of Wisconsin-Madison (with 14,000 out-of-state students), "Get It Free with Your Voter ID" pizza parties, and T-shirts with "Ask Me" (front) and "About Voter ID" (back).

On March 2, 2016, VoteRiders' team was responsible for organizing a press conference at the capitol that resulted in significant media attention, including coverage by all TV network affiliates. VoteRiders played a pivotal role in the Wisconsin legislature's and governor's decision to expand approved voter IDs to include a Veterans Affairs card. Based on the results of Voter ID Month, VoteRiders created toolkits for distribution to other communities in Wisconsin and across the country.

In 2020, VoteRiders became involved with Wisconsin and other states, working to measure and address the impact of COVID-19 on voter turnout for the 2020 US presidential election. Anita Johnson, Wisconsin Voter ID Coalition Coordinator at VoteRiders, was quoted in a Los Angeles Times report on the hurdles Black voters face: "It's sad that we should have to jump through hoops just to go exercise our right to vote."

References

Organizations established in 2012
Non-profit organizations based in California
Election and voting-related organizations based in the United States
2012 establishments in California